Saint Thomas the Hermit is a Saint of the Coptic Orthodox Church, he is also known as "Saint Thomas the Anchorite",  "Saint Thomas of Shenshif" or simply as "Abba Thomas"[(Coptic word meaning Father) (Αw-ba)Sahidic  (Αw-va)Bohairic]. Saint Thomas was born in Upper Egypt, in a small village known as "Shenshif". He is revered by the Coptic Orthodox Church, since he is one of the early Anchorites, or Desert Fathers. Little is commonly known about him.

Early life

Although little is known about his early life we do know where he was born, and the broad region of inheritance for his early monastic life.  Abba  Thomas was born in a village called Shenshif  (north Ekhmim  – Upper Egypt) of two pious parents who raised him in the fear of God. They brought him up well in all godliness and raised him in the Christian tradition. He led a quiet, peaceable life renouncing the vanities of the world and its lusts. Since day one he wanted to follow in the foot steps of Saint Anthony, and Saint Paul the First Hermit ; two of the first Anchorites. He left his home and headed towards the wilderness, where he lived in a cave in the mount of Shenshif.

Stories Concerning Saint Thomas
  Saint Thomas was granted the gift of prophecy
 Saint Thomas is commonly believed to have predicted his own death.
 Saint Thomas is said to have sat with Christ
 It was recorded by Saint Shenouda that as he walked towards the cave Saint Thomas inhabited in order to bury his body, he saw Jesus Christ fly off with the Saint's Spirit.

Monasteries and Churches

There are multiple Churches dedicated to the beloved Saint:
 Saint Thomas the Hermit Monastery, Akhmem, Egypt
 Saint Thomas the Hermit Coptic Orthodox Church, Temecula, CA

References

Coptic Orthodox saints